Takkella Padu is a village located between Kanigiri and Pamuru, in India. It is under Kanigiri Taluku and Kandukuru division. Takkella Padu consist of three colonies named Kancharalavari Palli (post), Vijaya Gopalapuram, and Narapareddyvaripalli, B.C colony.

Villages in Prakasam district